Organonickel(IV) complex are organonickel compounds that feature nickel in the +4 oxidation state. These high-valent nickel compounds are intermediates or models thereof for various catalytic reactions.

Representative preparation 
Ni(IV) complexes are typically supported by highly basic and chelating ligands.  They are often produced by oxidation of related Ni(II) and Ni(III) complexes using both conventional and exotic oxidants, such as ferrocenium and S-(trifluoromethyl)dibenzothiophenium triflate (Umemoto reagent). For example, one of the first isolated NiIV complexes that was used in a cross coupling transformation was reported by Linden and Dimitrov in 2003  and was prepared by simple air-induced oxidation of the following anionic NiII complex:

Reactivity and synthetic transformations

Carbon-heteroatom bond formation 
Studies reported by Sanford and Camasso in 2015 revealed the ability of a NiIV organometallic complex to deliver carbon(sp3)-oxygen, carbon(sp3)-nitrogen, and carbon(sp3)-sulfur bonds. The NiIV species was generated by oxidation of a nickel(II) trispyrazolylborate complex.

C-H activation 
In 2014, Chatani and coworkers proposed that a NiIV intermediate was formed during an aminoquinoline-directed aliphatic C-H activation process using diaryliodonium salts as an oxidant.

Trifluoromethylations 
NiIV can perform challenging trifluoromethylation reactions on (hetero)arenes. A representative method is shown below, reported by Nebra and coworkers in 2017. Here, a six-coordinate NiIV complex transfers a CF3 ligand to a functionalized arene.

A catalytic variant was reported by Sanford and coworkers in 2019. The mechanism for this transformation is shown in the following scheme. Here, the key NiIV intermediate undergoes a slow homolysis to produce a NiIII intermediate and a trifluoromethyl radical, which can promote propagation of the catalytic cycle.

References 

Organometallic compounds
Nickel compounds